Kaloki Nyamai (born in Kitui) is a Kenyan based multidisciplinary painter and sculptor whose practice combines material investigation with a wide-reaching exploration of subject matter.

Early life and education
Kaloki had his tertiary education at the Buruburu Institute Of Fine Arts (BIFA) where he studied Interior Design.

Career
Kaloki started his career as an artistic director and later started painting and creating graphic t-shirts in 2009.

External links
 Kaloki Nyamai

See also
 Wangechi Mutu
 Ingrid Mwangi
 Kawira Mwirichia
 Beatrice Wanjiku

References

Living people
Kenyan painters
People from Nairobi
Artists from Nairobi
Year of birth missing (living people)